The Girl from the Wardrobe is a 2013 Polish drama film directed by Bodo Kox.

Cast 
 Wojciech Mecwaldowski - Tomek
 Piotr Głowacki - Jacek
 Magdalena Rózanska - Magda
  - Krzysztof
  - Kwiatkowska
 Olga Bołądź - Aga

Awards and nominations 

Polish Academy Award for Discovery of the Year, for directing, Bodo Kox, award
Zbigniew Cybulski Award for best young Polish actor, Piotr Głowacki, award

Polish Academy Award for Best Supporting Actor, nomination
Polish Academy Award for Best Production Design, nomination

References

External links 

2013 drama films
2013 films
Polish drama films